Emmett O'Neal "Buck" White (February 7, 1911 – January 23, 1982) was an American professional golfer who played on the PGA Tour.

White was born in Memphis, Tennessee. White won three times on the PGA Tour between 1946 and 1951.

In 1961, White was the first golfer to shoot 63 in the PGA Seniors' Championship, a tournament scoring record that wasn't broken until 2012.

Following his retirement from competitive golf, White worked as a golf instructor in the Miami, Florida, area, where he taught many players including a number of PGA Tour professionals.

Professional wins (5)

PGA Tour wins (3)

Other wins (2)
this list may be incomplete
1944 Kentucky Open
1947 Michigan Open

References

American male golfers
PGA Tour golfers
Golfers from Memphis, Tennessee
1911 births
1982 deaths